Platygyra daedalea, sometimes known as the lesser valley coral, is a colonial species of stony coral in the family Merulinidae. It occurs on reefs in shallow water in the Indo-Pacific region. It is a common species and the International Union for Conservation of Nature has assessed its conservation status as being of "least concern".

Description
Platygyra daedalea usually forms massive dome or boulder-shaped colonies which may be a metre (yard) or more in diameter; however, sometimes it forms flattened plates or it may be encrusting. The polyps are situated in meandering valleys with low walls between them which are often perforated. The septa are toothed and protuberant, usually with uneven or pointed tips. There is an obvious ridge, the columella, in the centre of the valley. The colour varies and there may be contrasting valleys and ridges. This coral can be distinguished from the similar but less common Platygyra lamellina by the fact that the valleys are wider and the walls between them have more vertical sides and have flatter tops.

Distribution and habitat
Platygyra daedalea is a common species with a widespread distribution in the Indo-Pacific region. Its range extends from Madagascar, the east coast of Africa, the Red Sea and the Gulf of Aden, to Australia, Indonesia, Japan and the South China Sea. It is particularly common in the Gulf of Thailand and South China Sea.

Ecology

The polyps of P. daedalea expand at night to catch planktonic particles floating by. However, this coral obtains most of its nourishment from the dinoflagellates known as zooxanthellae it houses within its tissues. These provide organic carbon and nitrogen, the products of photosynthesis, to their host. To benefit from this  symbiotic arrangement, P. daedalea needs to grow in shallow, sunlit environments.

Platygyra daedalea is an aggressive coral and seeks to prevent competitors from overshadowing it. Researchers placed small colonies of this species alongside similar-sized colonies of the less-aggressive Favites complanata. Some of the tentacles of P. daedalea developed into sweeper tentacles which then inflicted damage on the soft tissues of the adjoining F. complanata. The soft tissue damage was extensive, the skeleton was laid bare in places and sponges, algae and other fouling organisms grew on it. Three of the ten corals that were attacked eventually died.

References

External links
 

Merulinidae
Corals described in 1786